Ma'asir al-Umara, written by Samsam ud Daula Shah Nawaz Khan  and his son Abdul Hai Khan, at Aurangabad, is a Persian-language biography of notables in the Mughal Empire during the time period approximately 1556–1780. Variants of the title include Ma'athir al-Umara, Maasir al-Umara, and Maathir ul-Umara. Shah Nawaz Khan relies upon a variety of Persian histories for his information, which he lists in his introduction.

An English translation by Beni Prasad and H. Beveridge is available.

References
Gazetteer Of Aurangabad (1884)

External links
Ma'asir al-Umara, Vol. 1 (English)
Ma'asir al-Umara, Vol. 2 (English)
Ma'asir al-Umara, Vol. 1 (Persian)
Ma'asir al-Umara, Vol. 2 (Persian)
Ma'asir al-Umara, Vol. 3 (Persian)

Biographies (books)
History of Aurangabad, Maharashtra
Books about the Mughal Empire